Tanner Witt (born July 11, 2002) is an American college baseball pitcher for the Texas Longhorns.

Amateur career
Witt grew up in Houston, Texas and attended Episcopal High School in Bellaire, Texas. He pitched for the United States Under-15 National team in the 2017 COPABE Pan American Championships. Witt was considered an early-round prospect in the 2020 Major League Baseball draft, but opted to affirm his commitment to play college baseball at the University of Texas.

Witt made 28 appearances as a reliever during his freshman season with the Longhorns and went 5–0 with a 3.16 ERA and 73 strikeouts in 57 innings pitched. After the 2021 season, he played collegiate summer baseball for the Chatham Anglers of the Cape Cod Baseball League. Witt entered his sophomore season as a starter. He tore the ulnar collateral ligament in his pitching elbow in his second start, requiring him to undergo Tommy John surgery and miss the remainder of the season. Witt won both of his starts and had a 1.64 ERA and 14 strikeouts in 11 innings pitched. Texas would go on to make the 2022 College World Series. Witt missed the beginning of his junior season while recovering from the surgery.

Personal life
Witt's father, Kevin Witt, played five seasons in the Major Leagues. His mother, Lori, played softball at Texas.

References

External links

Texas Longhorns bio

Living people
Baseball players from Texas
Baseball pitchers
Texas Longhorns baseball players
Chatham Anglers players
2002 births